Qatar competed at the 1992 Summer Olympics in Barcelona, Spain. The nation won its first Olympic medal at these Games.

Medalists

Competitors
The following is the list of number of competitors in the Games.

Results by event

Athletics
Men's 4 × 400 m Relay
Sami Jumah, Masoud Khamis, Ibrahim Ismail Muftah, and Fareh Ibrahim Ali   
 Heat — 3:07.26 (→ did not advance)

Men's Long Jump
Abdullah Mohamed Al-Sheib 
 Qualification — 7.27 m (→ did not advance)

Men's Shot Put
Bilal Saad Mubarak 
 Qualification — 17.01 m (→ did not advance)

References

Official Olympic Reports
International Olympic Committee results database
sports-reference

Nations at the 1992 Summer Olympics
1992
Olympics